The 2008 BWF Super Series Masters Finals is the season ending tournament for 2008 BWF Super Series in badminton. It is held in Kota Kinabalu, Sabah, Malaysia from December 18 to December 21, 2008.

The tournament was marred with the withdrawal of China, citing tiredness and injuries to their players.

Representatives by nation

§: Robert Blair from England was the only player who played in two categories (men's doubles and mixed doubles), while Kamilla Rytter Juhl from Denmark, Wong Pei Tty from Malaysia, Kunchala Voravichitchaikul from Thailand, Lilyana Natsir and Vita Marissa from Indonesia were the players who played in two categories (women's doubles and mixed doubles).

Performance by nation

Men's singles

Seeds
 Lee Chong Wei  
 Sony Dwi Kuncoro
 Joachim Persson
 Peter Gade
 Taufik Hidayat
 Chan Yan Kit
 Andrew Smith
 Wong Choong Hann

Group A

Group B

Results

Women's singles

Seeds
 Zhou Mi  
 Tine Rasmussen  
 Wang Chen  
 Pi Hongyan
 Xu Huaiwen
 Wong Mew Choo
 Saina Nehwal  
 Yu Hirayama

Group A

Group B

Results

Men's doubles

Seeds
 Markis Kido / Hendra Setiawan  
 Mohd Zakry Abdul Latif / Mohd Fairuzizuan Mohd Tazari  
 Jung Jae-sung / Lee Yong-dae  
 Mathias Boe / Carsten Mogensen
 Candra Wijaya /  Tony Gunawan
 Koo Kien Keat / Tan Boon Heong  
 Simon Mollyhus / Anders Kristiansen
 Robert Blair / Chris Adcock

Group A

Group B

Results

Women's doubles

Seeds
 Wong Pei Tty / Chin Eei Hui  
 Lilyana Natsir / Vita Marissa  
 Lena Frier Kristiansen / Kamilla Rytter Juhl
 Ha Jung-eun / Kim Min-jung  
 Charmaine Reid /  Nicole Grether
 Duanganong Aroonkesorn / Kunchala Voravichitchaikul
 Jo Novita / Greysia Polii  
 Judith Meulendijks / Yao Jie

Group A

Group B

Results

Mixed doubles

Seeds
 Nova Widianto / Lilyana Natsir
 Thomas Laybourn / Kamilla Rytter Juhl  
 Anthony Clark / Donna Kellogg
 Robert Blair /  Imogen Bankier
 Sudket Prapakamol / Saralee Thoungthongkam
 Songphon Anugritayawon / Kunchala Voravichitchaikul
 Flandy Limpele / Vita Marissa
 Lim Khim Wah / Wong Pei Tty

Group A

Group B

Results

References

External links
World Super Series Masters Finals 2008 at tournamentsoftware.com

Bwf Super Series Masters Finals, 2008
Masters Finals
Kota Kinabalu
BWF Super Series Finals
Badminton tournaments in Malaysia